Naisby is a surname. Notable people with the surname include:
 Paul Naisby (born 1955), British swimmer
 Tom Naisby (1878–1927), English footballer

See also
 Naseby (disambiguation)